Lindsay Alexander Dey CBE (31 May 1886 – 22 July 1973) was an Australian paediatric physician who was the president of the Royal Alexandra Hospital for Children's Board of Management from 1946 until 1959.

Early life
Dey was born at Petersham, New South Wales, the son of Dr Robert Dey, and attended Newington College (18971904). In 1902 and 1903 he was awarded the Wigram Allen Scholarship, awarded by Sir George Wigram Allen, sharing it in 1903 with Carleton Allen. At the end of 1904 he was named Dux of the College and received the Schofield Scholarship. He went up to the University of Sydney in 1905 from whence he graduated M.B. in 1910 and Ch.M. in 1912.

Medical career
In 1917 Dey became an honorary medical officer at Royal Alexandra Hospital for Children. He was a member of the council of the New South Wales branch of the British Medical Association from 1926 until 1946, and president in 1937-38.

Family
Lindsay Dey and his wife Marie, a nursing sister, had three sons and two daughters. Three of his children followed him into medicine. Dr David Lindsay Dey, MBMS (Syd), FRACS, became a paediatric surgeon, specialising in cleft lips as well as general plastic surgery, Robert Lindsay Dey, MBBS (Syd) joined the family practice at North Sydney and his daughter, Dr Judith Dey AO, MBBS (Syd), DCH (Lon), followed him in the medical speciality of paediatrics.

Honours
 Commander of the Order of the British Empire (Civil) granted 13 June 1959 in recognition of service to medicine
 Lindsay Dey Outpatient wing of the new Children's Hospital at Westmead is named in his honour.

References

1886 births
1973 deaths
People educated at Newington College
University of Sydney alumni
Australian paediatricians